Staraya Kupavna (Old Kupavna) is a town in Noginsky District of Moscow Oblast, Russia, located on the left bank of the Shalovka River (Klyazma's tributary)  east of Moscow. Population: .

History

Under the name of Kupavna, it was first mentioned in the 14th century. It was granted town status in 2004.

Administrative and municipal status
Within the framework of administrative divisions, it is, together with five rural localities, incorporated within Noginsky District as the Town of Staraya Kupavna. As a municipal division, the Town of Staraya Kupavna is incorporated within Noginsky Municipal District as Staraya Kupavna Urban Settlement.

Economy
Over thirty companies are operating in the industrial area of the town, including: OJSC Pharmaceutical plant "Akrikhin", CJSC "Base #1 Chimreaktivov", CJSC "Textile firma Kupavna", OJSC "Zhelezobeton, OJSC "Moskhim", OJSC "Lakra Sintez", OJSC "Biserovsky kombinat etc.

Transportation
Kupavna railway station is located on the Moscow–Nizhny Novgorod line  from the town. Local buses link the town with Moscow, Noginsk, and Monino.

Politics
On November 23, 2009, the former mayor of Staraya Kupavna, Anatoly Pleshan, was convicted of taking a bribe for assisting a developer with getting an approval from the residents for construction of a high-rise condo and sentenced to seven years in prison.

Culture and media
There is a cultural center "Akrikhin", named after local pharmaceutical producer Akrikhin.

Weekly newspaper Staraya Kupavna was first published in 1998. Since 2004, Alternativnaya gazeta newspaper has been published, with over 10,000 copies in 2004-2006. In 2008, Molodaya Kupavna newspaper was first issued and TV channel Staraya Kupavna started broadcasting.

Religion

The Holy Trinity Russian Orthodox church built in 1751 has recently been reopened after being closed in Soviet times.

References

Notes

Sources

External links
Official website of Staraya Kupavna 
Unofficial website of Staraya Kupavna 

Cities and towns in Moscow Oblast
Moscow Governorate